James Hilary Gildea (October 21, 1890 – June 5, 1988) was an American politician, newspaperman and a Democratic member of the U.S. House of Representatives from Pennsylvania.

James H. Gildea was born in Coaldale Schuylkill County, Pennsylvania.  He was apprenticed to the printing trade in 1905.  He was engaged in the newspaper publishing business from 1910, when he founded the Coaldale Observer.  He worked as chairman of the Coaldale Relief Society from 1930 to 1933, and of the Panther Valley Miners' Equalization Committee.

Gildea was elected as a Democrat to the Seventy-fourth and to the Seventy-fifth Congresses.  He was an unsuccessful candidate for reelection in 1938, 1940, and 1950.  He resumed newspaper publishing until his retirement in 1972.  He also worked as superintendent of the Coaldale State Hospital from 1962 to 1965.  He also managed a professional football team, the Coaldale Big Green.  He was a resident of Arlington, Virginia, until his death there.  He is buried in St. Joseph's Cemetery in Summit Hill, Pennsylvania.

Sources

The Political Graveyard
 Coaldale's Man of Action (football)

American newspaper publishers (people)
1890 births
1988 deaths
American newspaper founders
Democratic Party members of the United States House of Representatives from Pennsylvania
People from Schuylkill County, Pennsylvania
20th-century American politicians
Journalists from Pennsylvania
20th-century American journalists
American male journalists